Point Udall  may refer to:

Point Udall (Guam), named after Mo Udall and regarded as the westernmost point of the United States
Point Udall (U.S. Virgin Islands), named after Stewart Udall and regarded as the easternmost point of the United States

de:Point Udall
no:Point Udall